Seven Women from Hell is a 1961 war drama directed by Robert D. Webb and starring Patricia Owens, Denise Darcel (in her final film), Margia Dean, Yvonne Craig and Cesar Romero about women prisoners in a Japanese World War II prison camp, interned with other prisoners.

Plot
When the Japanese invade New Guinea in 1942, Grace Ingram (Patricia Owens), an Australian member of a scientific expedition, is captured and then imprisoned in a women's detention camp. She shares her prison barrack with six other women: Janet Cook (Yvonne Craig), a pregnant American teenager; Ann Van Laer (Sylvia Daneel), a tightlipped but sympathetic German widow; Claire Oudry (Denise Darcel), a French waitress; Mai-Lu Ferguson (Pilar Seurat), a Eurasian nurse; and two other Americans, Mara Shepherd (Margia Dean), an ignorant rich woman, and Regan (Evadne Baker), a soft-spoken young lady.

During a bombing raid, Janet's baby is born dead and the humane Captain Oda (Bob Okazaki) is killed. Sergeant Takahashi (Richard Loo), his sadistic assistant, assumes command of the camp, and a friendly Japanese, Doctor Matsumo (Yuki Shimoda), helps the women escape.

Mara is recaptured and tortured to death, and Claire and Regan are killed by rifle fire. The surviving four encounter a wounded American flyer, Lt. Bill Jackson (John Kerr), who helps them make their way to the beach but dies before they can reach safety. A wealthy planter, Luis Hullman (Cesar Romero), finds the girls, feigns friendship, and then attempts to hand them over to the Japanese. But the women learn of his plan, kill him, and escape by boat to the Allied lines.

Cast
 Patricia Owens as Grace Ingram
 Denise Darcel as Claire Oudry
 Cesar Romero as Luis Hullman
 John Kerr as Lt. Bill Jackson
 Margia Dean as Mara Shepherd
 Yvonne Craig as Janet Cook
 Pilar Seurat as Mai-Lu Ferguson
 Sylvia Daneel as Anna Van Laer
 Richard Loo as Sgt. Takahashi
 Evadne Baker as Regan
 Bob Okazaki as Capt. Oda
 Yuki Shimoda as Dr. Matsumo
 Lloyd Kino as Rapist Guard
 Kam Fong as House Guard

Production
The film was written by Jesse Lasky Jr. and his wife, Pat Silver-Lasky for producer Robert Lippert, who had a deal with Fox to make low budget films. John Kerr was signed to star.

The film was shot in Hawaii in June 1961.

See also
 List of American films of 1961

References

External links 
 
 
 
 

1961 films
Pacific War films
Films directed by Robert D. Webb
1960s war drama films
World War II prisoner of war films
Films set in Papua New Guinea
American war drama films
1961 drama films
1960s English-language films
1960s American films